Ames crater is a meteorite crater (astrobleme) in Major County, Oklahoma, United States. Buried under a thick layer of sediment, it was not discovered until 1991. Subsequent drilling within the crater found a large amount of oil and gas. It is one of the largest of six  meteor craters associated with oil-producing formations in the United States.

Crater description 

The crater is not exposed at the surface.
It may be one of several Middle Ordovician meteors that fell roughly simultaneously 469 million years ago, part of a proposed Ordovician meteor event, including the Decorah crater in Iowa, the Slate Islands crater in Lake Superior, and the Rock Elm crater in Wisconsin.

The crater's origin has been postulated as meteorite impact, volcanic activity, dissolution collapse and other causes. Geomorphology, rock textures, mineralogies and stratigraphic arguments have been used to support impact origin.

Discovery 
When the meteor struck, this part of the earth was covered by a shallow sea. This created enormous pressures below the point of impact, which made the remnant of the meteorite recoil slightly, creating an uplift. The sea returned and over eons, deposited layers of sediment. Other geological movements tilted the formation slightly. The sea eventually disappeared, leaving the crater buried in the earth, invisible from the surface. It was discovered by Rex Olson in 1991 as he was studying a map generated using data from seismic tests. Olson, an exploration manager for Continental Resources, saw a seismic pattern that resembled a hoof print, or "a cow track in the mud". Showing the map to Harold Hamm, owner and chief executive officer (CEO) of the company, he pointed out what appeared to be an anomaly or "glitch" in the data. The two agreed that the anomaly resembled an astrobleme, a term meaning "star wound."

An unknown number of concealed impact sites have been discovered. Some have produced uranium, gold or diamonds. Prior to 1991, geologists were skeptical that worthwhile quantities of oil and gas could be found at such a site.

Oil and gas production 
It was discovered only in 1991. Prior to its discovery, many geologists believed that impact craters were unlikely to contain petroleum. Wells had been drilled near the crater site since the 1960s, but none had been drilled within the crater. However,  Continental Resources drilled deep into the crater.

The crater penetrated the Arbuckle Dolomite which resulted in vast amounts of oil and gas becoming accessible in the fractured rock. There were even rumors that the impact might have created diamonds. But no evidence of that was found. Iridium was also not found although it is used to identify astroblemes elsewhere.

At least 60 wells have been drilled in Ames Crater since 1991. About 30 of the original wells were still producing in 2007.

Notes

References

External links 
  Judson L. Ahern, Univ. of Okla.: Imaging the Ames Impact Structure - good general interest article
  Ahern, Judson L. "The Potential of Potential Fields for Detecting Buried Impact Structures: Earth and Mars."
 Denofrio, Richard R. "North American impact structures hold giant field potential." Oil & Gas Journal. May 11, 1998. Retrieved May 17, 2014. Good discussion of why hydrocarbons are found in some meteoric impact structures and not in others.
 Aerial Exploration of the Slate Islands Structure
 Osinski, Gordon R. "Meteorite impact structures: the good and the bad." Geology Today. Vol 24, No. 1. January–February 2008. Retrieved May 26, 2014.

Impact craters of the United States
Ordovician impact craters
Landforms of Oklahoma
Landforms of Major County, Oklahoma